The Russian Federation Presidential Certificate of Honour is an honorary award bestowed by the President of the Russian Federation to deserving citizens. It was established by Presidential Decree No.487 of 11 April 2008.  The statute and regulations governing this award were amended on two occasions, first on 12 January 2010 by Presidential Decree No.59 and again on 14 January 2011 by Presidential Decree No. 38.

Statute
In accordance with regulations, the Certificate of Honour is a form of promotion and public recognition:

The Certificate of Honour is awarded during an official ceremony by the President or from his name by the other government official.  Recipients of the Russian Federation Presidential Certificate of Honour also receive a badge for wear on civilian clothing.

Award description
The certificate is rectangular and bordered by the national colours of Russia, white blue and red.  At top center, the coat of arms of the Russian Federation, immediately below it, the inscription in gold letters on two lines "Russian Federation Presidential Certificate of Honour".  The recipient's name and the award citation follow below.

The badge is circular, 20mm in diameter and struck from silver.  Its ruby enamelled obverse bears the gilt Emblem of Russia within a gilt laurel wreath.  Each award is serialised on the reverse.

See also
Awards and decorations of the Russian Federation

References

External links
Web site of the President of the Russian Federation
The Russian Gazette

Civil awards and decorations of Russia
Awards established in 2008